In mathematics the spin group Spin(n) is a Lie group whose underlying manifold is the double cover of the special orthogonal group , such that there exists a short exact sequence of Lie groups (when )

As a Lie group, Spin(n) therefore shares its dimension, and its Lie algebra with the special orthogonal group.

For , Spin(n) is simply connected and so coincides with the universal cover of SO(n).

The non-trivial element of the kernel is denoted −1, which should not be confused with the orthogonal transform of reflection through the origin, generally denoted −.

Spin(n) can be constructed as a subgroup of the invertible elements in the Clifford algebra Cl(n). A distinct article discusses the spin representations.

Motivation and physical interpretation
The spin group is used in physics to describe the symmetries of (electrically neutral, uncharged) fermions. Its complexification, Spinc, is used to describe electrically charged fermions, most notably the electron. Strictly speaking, the spin group describes a fermion in a zero-dimensional space; but of course, space is not zero-dimensional, and so the spin group is used to define spin structures on (pseudo-)Riemannian manifolds: the spin group is the structure group of a spinor bundle. The affine connection on a spinor bundle is the spin connection; the spin connection is useful as it can simplify and bring elegance to many intricate calculations in general relativity.  The spin connection in turn enables the Dirac equation to be written in curved spacetime (effectively in the tetrad coordinates), which in turn provides a footing for quantum gravity, as well as a formalization of Hawking radiation (where one of a pair of entangled, virtual fermions falls past the event horizon, and the other does not). In short, the spin group is a vital cornerstone, centrally important for understanding advanced concepts in modern theoretical physics. In mathematics, the spin group is interesting in its own right: not only for these reasons, but for many more.

Construction
Construction of the Spin group often starts with the construction of a Clifford algebra over a real vector space V with a definite quadratic form q. The Clifford algebra is the quotient of the tensor algebra TV of V by a two-sided ideal.  The tensor algebra (over the reals) may be written as 

The Clifford algebra Cl(V) is then the quotient algebra

where  is the quadratic form applied to a vector . The resulting space is finite dimensional, naturally graded (as a vector space), and can be written as 

The spin algebra  is defined as

where the last is a short-hand for V being a real vector space of real dimension n.  It is a Lie algebra; it has a natural action on V, and in this way can be shown to be isomorphic to the Lie algebra  of the special orthogonal group.

The pin group  is a subgroup of 's Clifford group of all elements of the form 
 
where each  is of unit length: 

The spin group is then defined as 

where 

is the subspace generated by elements that are the product of an even number of vectors. That is, Spin(V) consists of all elements of Pin(V), given above, with the restriction to k being an even number. The restriction to the even subspace is key to the formation of two-component (Weyl) spinors, constructed below.

If the set  are an orthonormal basis of the (real) vector space V, then the quotient above endows the space with a natural anti-commuting structure:
 for 
This anti-commutation turns out to be of importance in physics, as it captures the spirit of the Pauli exclusion principle for fermions. A precise formulation is out of scope, here, but it involves the creation of a spinor bundle on Minkowski spacetime; the resulting spinor fields can be seen to be anti-commuting as a by-product of the Clifford algebra construction. This anti-commutation property is also key to the formulation of supersymmetry. The Clifford algebra and the spin group have many interesting and curious properties, some of which are listed below.

Geometric construction 
The spin groups can be constructed less explicitly but without appealing to Clifford algebras. Its multiplication law can be defined by lifting as follows. Call the covering map . Then  is a set with two elements, and one can be chosen without loss of generality to be the identity. Call this . These define a path  in  defined  satisfying .

It can then be shown that this definition is independent of the paths , that the multiplication is continuous, and the group axioms are satisfied with inversion being continuous, making  a Lie group.

Double covering
For a quadratic space V, a double covering of SO(V) by Spin(V) can be given explicitly, as follows.  Let  be an orthonormal basis for V.  Define an antiautomorphism  by

It is an antihomomorphism since

Observe that Pin(V) can then be defined as all elements  for which

Now define the automorphism  which on degree 1 elements is given by

and let  denote , which is an antiautomorphism of Cl(V). With this notation, an explicit double covering is the homomorphism  given by

where . When a has degree 1 (i.e. ),  corresponds a reflection across the hyperplane orthogonal to a; this follows from the anti-commuting property of the Clifford algebra.

Spinor space
It is worth reviewing how spinor space and Weyl spinors are constructed, given this formalism. It can be written as the direct sum of a subspace  of spinors and a subspace  of anti-spinors:

The space  is spanned by the spinors

It is straightforward to see that the spinors anti-commute, and that the product of a spinor and anti-spinor is a scalar.

The spinor space is defined as the exterior algebra . The (complexified) Clifford algebra acts naturally on this space; the (complexified) spin group corresponds to the length-preserving endomorphisms. There is a natural grading on the exterior algebra: the product of an odd number of copies of  correspond to the physics notion of fermions; the even subspace corresponds to the bosons. The representations of the action of the spin group on the spinor space can be built in a relatively straightforward fashion.

Complex case

The SpinC group is defined by the exact sequence 

It is a multiplicative subgroup of the complexification  of the Clifford algebra, and specifically, it is the subgroup generated by Spin(V) and the unit circle in C.  Alternately, it is the quotient

This has important applications in 4-manifold theory and Seiberg–Witten theory.  In physics, the Spin group is appropriate for describing uncharged fermions, while the SpinC group is used to describe electrically charged fermions. In this case, the U(1) symmetry is specifically the gauge group of electromagnetism.

Exceptional isomorphisms
In low dimensions, there are isomorphisms among the classical Lie groups called exceptional isomorphisms. For instance, there are isomorphisms between low-dimensional spin groups and certain classical Lie groups, owing to low-dimensional isomorphisms between the root systems (and corresponding isomorphisms of Dynkin diagrams) of the different families of simple Lie algebras. Writing R for the reals, C for the complex numbers, H for the quaternions and the general understanding that Cl(n) is a short-hand for Cl(Rn) and that Spin(n) is a short-hand for Spin(Rn) and so on, one then has that

Cleven(1) = R the real numbers
Pin(1) = {+i, −i, +1, −1}
Spin(1) = O(1) = {+1, −1}      the orthogonal group of dimension zero.
--
Cleven(2) = C the complex numbers
Spin(2) = U(1) = SO(2), which acts on z in R2 by double phase rotation . Corresponds to the abelian .       dim = 1
--
Cleven(3) = H the quaternions
--
Cleven(4) = H ⊕ H
--
Cleven(5)= M(2, H) the two-by-two matrices with quaternionic coefficients
--
Cleven(6)= M(4, C) the four-by-four matrices with complex coefficients

For higher n, these isomorphisms disappear entirely.

Indefinite signature
In indefinite signature, the spin group  is constructed through Clifford algebras in a similar way to standard spin groups. For ,  is connected; for  there are two connected components. As in definite signature, there are some accidental isomorphisms in low dimensions:

Spin(1, 1) = GL(1, R)
Spin(2, 1) = SL(2, R)
Spin(3, 1) = SL(2, C)
Spin(2, 2) = SL(2, R) × SL(2, R)
Spin(4, 1) = Sp(1, 1)
Spin(3, 2) = Sp(4, R)
Spin(5, 1) = SL(2, H)
Spin(4, 2) = SU(2, 2)
Spin(3, 3) = SL(4, R)
Spin(6, 2) = SU(2, 2, H)

Note that .

Topological considerations
Connected and simply connected Lie groups are classified by their Lie algebra. So if G is a connected Lie group with a simple Lie algebra, with G′ the universal cover of G, there is an inclusion

with Z(G′) the center of G′. This inclusion and the Lie algebra  of G determine G entirely (note that it is not the case that  and π1(G) determine G entirely; for instance SL(2, R) and PSL(2, R) have the same Lie algebra and same fundamental group Z, but are not isomorphic).

The definite signature Spin(n) are all simply connected for n > 2, so they are the universal coverings of SO(n).

In indefinite signature, Spin(p, q) is not necessarily connected, and in general the identity component, Spin0(p,  q), is not simply connected, thus it is not a universal cover. The fundamental group is most easily understood by considering the maximal compact subgroup of SO(p,  q), which is SO(p) × SO(q), and noting that rather than being the product of the 2-fold covers (hence a 4-fold cover), Spin(p,  q) is the "diagonal" 2-fold cover – it is a 2-fold quotient of the 4-fold cover. Explicitly, the maximal compact connected subgroup of Spin(p,  q) is

Spin(p) × Spin(q)/{(1, 1), (−1, −1)}.

This allows us to calculate the fundamental groups of SO(p, q), taking p ≥ q:

Thus once  the fundamental group is Z2, as it is a 2-fold quotient of a product of two universal covers.

The maps on fundamental groups are given as follows.

Fundamental groups of SO(n) 
The fundamental groups  can be more directly derived using results in homotopy theory.

The proof uses known results in algebraic topology.

The same argument can be used to show , by considering a fibration

Center

Quotient groups
Quotient groups can be obtained from a spin group by quotienting out by a subgroup of the center, with the spin group then being a covering group of the resulting quotient, and both groups having the same Lie algebra.

Quotienting out by the entire center yields the minimal such group, the projective special orthogonal group, which is centerless, while quotienting out by {±1} yields the special orthogonal group – if the center equals {±1} (namely in odd dimension), these two quotient groups agree. If the spin group is simply connected (as Spin(n) is for ), then Spin is the maximal group in the sequence, and one has a sequence of three groups,
Spin(n) → SO(n) → PSO(n),
splitting by parity yields:
Spin(2n) → SO(2n) → PSO(2n),
Spin(2n+1) → SO(2n+1) = PSO(2n+1),
which are the three compact real forms (or two, if ) of the compact Lie algebra 

For , Spin(n) is simply connected ( is trivial), so SO(n) is connected and has fundamental group Z2 while PSO(n) is connected and has fundamental group equal to the center of Spin(n).

In indefinite signature the covers and homotopy groups are more complicated – Spin(p, q) is not simply connected, and quotienting also affects connected components.

Whitehead tower
The spin group appears in a Whitehead tower anchored by the orthogonal group:

The tower is obtained by successively removing (killing) homotopy groups of increasing order. This is done by constructing short exact sequences starting with an Eilenberg–MacLane space for the homotopy group to be removed. Killing the 3 homotopy group in Spin(n), one obtains the infinite-dimensional string group String(n).

Discrete subgroups
Discrete subgroups of the spin group can be understood by relating them to discrete subgroups of the special orthogonal group (rotational point groups).

Given the double cover , by the lattice theorem, there is a Galois connection between subgroups of Spin(n) and subgroups of SO(n) (rotational point groups): the image of a subgroup of Spin(n) is a rotational point group, and the preimage of a point group is a subgroup of Spin(n), and the closure operator on subgroups of Spin(n) is multiplication by {±1}. These may be called "binary point groups"; most familiar is the 3-dimensional case, known as binary polyhedral groups.

Concretely, every binary point group is either the preimage of a point group (hence denoted 2G, for the point group G), or is an index 2 subgroup of the preimage of a point group which maps (isomorphically) onto the point group; in the latter case the full binary group is abstractly  (since {±1} is central).

Of particular note are two series:
 higher binary tetrahedral groups, corresponding to the 2-fold cover of symmetries of the n-simplex; this group can also be considered as the double cover of the symmetric group, with the alternating group being the (rotational) symmetry group of the n-simplex.
 higher binary octahedral groups, corresponding to the 2-fold covers of the hyperoctahedral group (symmetries of the hypercube, or equivalently of its dual, the cross-polytope).

For point groups that reverse orientation, the situation is more complicated, as there are two pin groups, so there are two possible binary groups corresponding to a given point group.

See also

 Clifford algebra
 Clifford analysis
 Spinor
 Spinor bundle
 Spin structure
 Table of Lie groups
 Anyon
 Orientation entanglement

Related groups
 Pin group Pin(n) – two-fold cover of orthogonal group, O(n)
 Metaplectic group Mp(2n) – two-fold cover of symplectic group, Sp(2n)
String group String(n) – the next group in the Whitehead tower

References

External links 
 The essential dimension of spin groups is OEIS:A280191.
 Grothendieck's "torsion index" is OEIS:A096336.

Further reading
 

Lie groups
Topology of Lie groups
Spinors